Mogera is a genus of mole in the tribe Talpini. They are native to East Asia.

Species 
The genus contains the following species:

 Echigo mole (Mogera etigo)
 Small Japanese mole (Mogera imaizumii)
 Insular mole (Mogera insularis)
 Kano's mole (Mogera kanoana)
La Touche's mole (Mogera latouchei)
 Ussuri mole (Mogera robusta)
 Sado mole (Mogera tokudae)
 Senkaku mole (Mogera uchidai)
 Japanese mole (Mogera wogura)

Description 
Moles in this genus differ from Old World moles in the genus Talpa in having one fewer pairs of lower incisors and in having larger hind premolars in the lower jaw.

Moles of this genus vary in size. Kawada (2016) made a morphological revision of the Japanese mountain mole and proposed the actual position of this species (then known as Euroscaptor mizura) in Oreoscaptor. In this study, the author presented and compared morphometrics of [O]. mizura with 17 other species of talpids, which included 8 species of the genus Mogera. Some information from this study on their head-body length and tail length (in millimeters) and their weight (in grams) are presented in the table below.

References

External links 

 Mogera tokudae (Sado mole, Tokuda's mole)
 EDGE :: Mammal Species Information

Mogera
Mammal genera
Taxonomy articles created by Polbot